Lucy Foozie (born ), better known as simply Miss Foozie, is a character from Chicago. Time Out Chicago calls her a "drag hostess and entertainer", and Chicago Free Press has awarded her "best female impersonator". Since 2008, Miss Foozie has served as Community Ambassador for ChicagoPride.com.

In 1997, Miss Foozie was "born" at her portrayer's 37th birthday party. Since then, her career has included parades, four movies, and live performances throughout the United States.

Movies and television
In 2004, Miss Foozie appeared in Twenty Gay Stereotypes Confirmed, a tongue-in-cheek look at Gay stereotypes using the director's childhood home movies. She appears on the streets of Chicago introducing the third stereotype with her iconic catchphrase, "Hello, Pineapples!"

In 2005, Miss Foozie made a special appearance in Bowser Makes a Movie, a comedy with a young man struggling to make a Gay adult film. In 2007, Miss Foozie appeared as herself in Father Knows..., a Gay interest film involving a father-son relationship, Gay romance, and explicit sex. In 2009, Miss Foozie played herself again in Sister Mary, a dark comedy written and directed by Scott Grenke, starring Brent Corrigan, Bruce Vilanch, and producer James Vallo who plays Mark Rima, a homophobic Detective who must "partner" up with the very Gay and flamboyant Detective Chris Riant (Shawn Quinlan) to stop a serial killing Nun (Judy Tenuta) from offing 5 band members otherwise known as "The Ex Choir Boys", but when it is determined that the Detectives cannot solve the case on their own, expert F.B.I. profiler Agent Peccant (Ant) is assigned to the case. As the details of the case slowly emerge the police determine that the "nun" may only be a silent witness to the grisly murders. The task force then turns its attention on the Catholic Church and a suspect group of Priests that have had a propensity for "cleansing the souls" of innocent young choir boys.

On May 25, 2011, Connie de Bie spent "A Night with Miss Foozie" in Chicago with the Windy City celebrity for 1st Look Chicago on Life/Style Television, a division of NBCUniversal, describing, "She's a character artist with a supersized personality and when Miss Foozie enters a room, you'll know it! She's extremely well-known and supportive of Chicago's gay community. Watch as the two paint the town as Miss Foozie gears up for  The program was broadcast on June 19, 2011 on NBC nationwide after

Publications

On March 20, 2002, Miss Foozie appeared on the cover of Nightspots, an extensive, four-color glossy of Chicago's vibrant LGBT nightlife scene, published by Windy City Media Group, which also publishes Windy City Times, the city's oldest gay newspaper. Artwork of her appeared on the cover on May 1, 2005, and she appeared on the cover again in April 2007. In November 2002, she appeared on the cover of BoystownChicago, and she appeared on the cover again in 2005 as "Chicago's Most Loved Host".

For North Halsted Market Days in 2003, Chicago artist Lee Kay created a caricature of her in the window of Boystown adult shop Batteries Not  free magazine established in January 2000 distributed in bulk in the Chicago area, featured Kay's photo & artwork on the cover. In June 2004, she appeared on the cover of Chicago magazine Crusin'''. In June 2005, she advertised beads in print ad for Gay Mart in Chicago.

In March 2007, she appeared in Time Out Chicago, and her photo ran alongside a question she answered in a Gay & Lesbian article for their October 15–21, 2009 issue titled "Virgin territory"; Jason A. Heidemann asked some of their favorite LGBT Chicagoans to "reveal their first same-sex shag.": "My first time was all about who is the top and who is the bottom. That took five minutes."

In April 2007, she appeared on the cover of Gay Chicago Magazine and on October 29, 2009 as the Queen of Hearts for her then-upcoming role as hostess and emcee for the parade. Photographer Ashley Allen photographed her front and center with the other characters of Alice's Adventures in Wonderland: Alice, Mad Hatter, March Hare, and Cheshire Cat.

In April 2007, she appeared in a straight periodical, wig and all, for Chicago magazine's special report "Money in Chicago 2007". The section entitled "Who Makes What" featured other Chicagoans from a variety of professions from many walks of life with salaries from $200,000 to $0, where she revealed her own to be $23,500.

In June 2007, she was on the front page of Metromix for that year's pride parade, and she was featured in the "Summer Festivals" gallery in the Chicago section for Market Days of that year.

On August 24, 2007, Photographer Mia Algotti featured "Miss Foozie of  the crowd to try their hand at the dunking booth during North Halsted Market Days Saturday afternoon." The photo showed her in front of a dunk tank seating a twink in Skyline. Dave Ouano photographed her for the August 2007 cover of Chicago Free Press' Freetime'' section.

See also
 List of LGBT periodicals
 Newspapers of the Chicago metropolitan area

References

External links

 
 

1960 births
American drag queens
Living people
LGBT people from Illinois
People from Chicago